The 1967–68 season was Colchester United's 26th season in their history and their second successive season in the third tier of English football, the Third Division. Alongside competing in the Third Division, the club also participated in the FA Cup and the League Cup.

Colchester were relegated to the Fourth Division after a two–year stay in the Third Division. They succumbed following 15 defeats in 22 games, recording just one win during this time. Manager Neil Franklin was sacked two days after the season ending 5–1 home defeat by Peterborough United. They fared better in the FA Cup, earning a third round replay against First Division West Bromwich Albion where they were defeated 4–0, but exited the League Cup in the first round, beaten by Brighton & Hove Albion by the same scoreline.

Season overview
Colchester's league and FA Cup form contrasted during the 1967–68 season. A trip to Torquay United in the first round of the Cup saw the U's earn a replay at home, where they won 2–1. Essex rivals Chelmsford City were beaten 2–0 in the second round, a joint–best result for the campaign for Colchester. Layer Road then played host to First Division West Bromwich Albion in front of a crowd just short of 16,000. With the score at 1–1, both goalscorer Reg Stratton and John Mansfield had goals ruled out for infringements late on as the tie went to a replay. The U's lost 4–0 at The Hawthorns to the eventual Cup winners.

With the attention on Colchester's cup run, their league form had dropped significantly. After challenging for the promotion positions, Colchester lost 15 of their remaining 22 games after Boxing Day, winning just once. A new all-time record low attendance of 2,483 watched the final day 5–1 defeat by Peterborough United at Layer Road.

With Colchester relegated, and their third relegation in eight seasons, manager Neil Franklin was sacked two days after the season-ending defeat to Peterborough.

Players

Transfers

In

 Total spending:  ~ £4,000

Out

 Total incoming:  ~ £5,000

Match details

Third Division

Results round by round

League table

Matches

League Cup

FA Cup

Squad statistics

Appearances and goals

|-
!colspan="14"|Players who appeared for Colchester who left during the season

|}

Goalscorers

Clean sheets
Number of games goalkeepers kept a clean sheet.

Player debuts
Players making their first-team Colchester United debut in a fully competitive match.

See also
List of Colchester United F.C. seasons

References

General
Books

Websites

Specific

1967-68
English football clubs 1967–68 season